Blasphemy Day, also known as International Blasphemy Day or International Blasphemy Rights Day, educates individuals and groups about blasphemy laws and defends freedom of expression, especially the open criticism of religion which is criminalized in many countries. Blasphemy Day was introduced as a worldwide celebration by the Center for Inquiry in 2009.

Events worldwide on the first annual Blasphemy Day in 2009 included an art exhibit in Washington, D.C., and a free speech festival in Los Angeles.

Origins 
Blasphemy Day is celebrated on September 30 to coincide with the anniversary of the 2005 publication of satirical drawings of Muhammad in one of Denmark's newspapers, resulting in the Jyllands-Posten Muhammad cartoons controversy. Although the caricatures of Muhammad caused some controversy within Denmark, especially among Muslims, it became a widespread furor after Muslim imams in several countries stirred up violent protests in which Danish embassies were firebombed and over 100 people killed (counting the deaths from police opening fire on protesters). The idea to observe an International Blasphemy Rights Day originated in 2009. A student contacted the Center for Inquiry in Amherst, New York, to present the idea, which CFI then supported.

Intent 

During the first celebration of Blasphemy Day in 2009, Center for Inquiry President and CEO Ronald A. Lindsay stated in an interview with CNN: "[W]e think religious beliefs should be subject to examination and criticism just as political beliefs are, but we have a taboo on religion." According to USA Todays interview with Justin Trottier, a Toronto coordinator of Blasphemy Day, "We're not seeking to offend, but if in the course of dialogue and debate, people become offended, that's not an issue for us. There is no human right not to be offended."

Criminal punishment for blasphemy 

In some countries, blasphemy is punishable by death, such as in Afghanistan, Pakistan, Iran and Saudi Arabia.

Nine member states of the European Union have laws against blasphemy or religious insult: Austria, Cyprus, Finland, Germany, Greece, Italy, Poland, Portugal, and Spain. In addition, blasphemy has recently been repealed in a number of other countries: Denmark (repealed 2017), France (Alsace-Moselle region only, repealed in January 2017), Iceland (repealed 2015), Ireland (ended January 2020), and Malta (ended 2016).

In 2009 six US states still had anti-blasphemy laws on their books: Massachusetts, Michigan, South Carolina, Oklahoma, Pennsylvania, and Wyoming, but law professor Sarah Barringer Gordon states that they are "rarely enforced".

See also 
 Avijit Roy
 Charlie Hebdo
 Civil disobedience
 Narendra Dabholkar
 Worldwide Protests for Free Expression in Bangladesh
 The Satanic Verses

References

External links 
 Pictures for Everybody Draw Mohammed Day: 1 , 2 , 3, 4, 5, 6, 7, 8, 9, 10
 Blasphemy Day Facebook page
 The Center for Inquiry's Campaign for Free Expression

Articles containing video clips
Atheism
Atheism activism
Awareness days
Blasphemy
Censorship
Civil awareness days
Criticism of religion
Disengagement from religion
Freedom of expression
Irreligion
New Atheism
Nontheism
Public awareness campaigns
Public holidays in the United States
Recurring events established in 2009
Religion and society
Religion and atheism
Secularism
Separation of church and state
September observances
Unofficial observances